Ritchie Singer is an Australian actor.

Singer portrayed executive producer Richard Shapiro in the fictionalized 2005 American television movie/docudrama Dynasty: The Making of a Guilty Pleasure,  based on the creation and behind the scenes production of the 1980s prime time soap opera Dynasty. He also played Terence James 'Terry' Madigan in season three of the Australian police procedural Water Rats (1998).

Singer graduated from NIDA in 1983.

Select credits

Feature Film:
2013 	Doctor, Charlie's Country Vertigo Films, Rolf De Heer
2013 	Rev Rick, Rapturepalooza Lions Gate Films, Paul Middleditch
2001 	Sam Cohen, The Man Who Sued God Ben Gannon Productions, Mark Joffe
1999 	Rob Thomas, Paperback Hero Rimfire Productions, Anthony Bowman
1998 	Rob, Terra Nova Plaza Films, Paul Middleditch
1998 	Hotel Manager/Kiosk vendor, Dark City Mystery Clock, Alex Proyas
1997 	Mr Kamen, Blackrock Palm Beach Pictures, Steven Vidler
1995 	MC, Mighty Morphin; Power Rangers Twentieth Century Fox, Byan Spicer
1991 	Biffer, Till There Was You McElroy & McElroy, John Seale
1989 	Bollinger, Cappucino Archer Films, Anthony Bowman
1988 	Ben, Two Brothers Running Phillip Emmanuel, Ted Robinson
1987 	Gordon, Those Dear Departed Phillip Emmanuel, Ted Robinson
1987 	Richard Cleary, Incident At Ravensgate James Vernon Productions, Rolf De Heer
1986 	Con, Crocodile Dundee Rimfire Productions, Jon Cornell
1985 	Waiter, Bliss Triumph Films, Ray Lawrence

Stage:
2021    Doc,West Side Story
2019 	Doc West Side Story GWB, BB Group, Opera Australia, world tour Joey McKneely
2002 	Weasel Covert / Cox Four NIDA Company, Jon Clark
1999 	Val Skolsky, Laughter On The 23rd floor Ensemble, Adam Cook
1993 	Fraser, Love Muscle NIDA Company, Kevin Jackson
1993 	Don Carlos Homenides, De Histangua A Flea In Her Ear NIDA Company, Adam Cook
1992 	Dr Feine, Six Degrees Of Separation STC, Wayne Harrison
1992 	Gary Peter Lefkowitz, I Hate Hamlet Diana Bliss , Simon Hopkinson
1990 	Manolo Costazuela, The Odd Couple (Female) John Nicholls, Graham Blundell
1989 	Willy Loman, Dreams Of A Salesman (HSC Prog) STC, Gillian Jones
1989 	Dr Alpachio/ Grisoldi, Man Beast and Virtue Newtown Players, Charlie Little
1988 	Jonathan/Roger, Silence/A Slight Ache Lookout Theatre, Florian Messmer
1988 	Big Ralph, Cowgirls and Indians NIDA Company, Martha Follent
1988 	Rev Ledbeater, Conversations With Jesus NIDA Company, John Clark
1988 	Steve Hubble, A Streetcar Named Desire John Nicholls, Robin LeFevre
1986 	Polonius/Gravedifgger, Hamlet Q Theatre, Kevin Jackson
1986 	Bud, Sweet Bird of Youth Wilton Morley Prods, Kenneth Ives
1985 	The Lieutenant, Dance of Death STC, Jim Sharman
1984 	The Ref,   Trafford Tanzi    Theatre ACT, Peter Barclay
1984 	Hans, The Department Theatre ACT, Rodney Fisher
1982 	Writer/Performer Limited Edition STC, Graeme Murphy

Television:
2018 	Dr Chaudhary, Reckoning Playmaker Media, Shawn Seet
2017 	Magistrate, Home & Away Channel 7, Various
2017 	Rabbi Cohen, A Place To Call Home Seven Productions Pty Ltd, Mark Joffe
2011 	Justice Rosenberg, Crownies Screentime, Various
2009 	Doctor Earnest, Gruen Transfer ABC TV, Matt Harris
2008 	Bob Hardcastle, Australia Welcomes Snoop Dogg Plaza Films for MTV, Paul Middleditch
2004 	Richard Shapiro, Dynasty (Behind the Scenes) US Hallmark, Matt Miller
1999 	Louie Lugarno, Airtight Greenboe Corp., Ian Barry
1998 	Sam Emmanuel, Kings in Grass Castles Barron Films, John Wood
1998 	Terry Madigan, Water Rats Water Rats, Various
1998 	Justin De Carlo, Blue Heelers Channel 9, Ric Pellizari
1990 	Doctor Rogers, Fresh Start ABC TV, Various
1989 	Daryl, Police Rescue ABC, Geoff Nottage
1988 	Youseff K, Mission Impossible Paramount, Arch Nicholson
1988 	Barney Splatt, Flying Doctors Channel 7, Various
1987 	Mr Yilmaz, Rafferty's Rules ABCTV, Geoff Nottage
1986 	Barry Lasker, GP ABC TV, Scott Murray
1986 	Lassiter, The Last Warhorse JNP, Robert Meillon
1985 	Myer, Palace Of Dreams ABC TV, Various
1985 	Max Moore, Shout Ben Gannon Prodns, Ted Robinson
1984 	Minder, Sons and Daughters Channel 7, Various

Commercial:
2016 	Boss BCFing The Sweet Shop, Nick Kelly
2013 	Costa Nando's Plaza Films, Paul Middleditch
2011 	Gary Bilson Agent First National R.E. Plaza Films, Paul Middleditch
2011 	Interviewer Betfair Plaza, Dave Kleber
2010 	Gary Bilson First National R.E. Plaza Films, Paul Middleditch
2007 	Panel Judge Flashbeer Plaza Films for Carlton Draught, Paul Middleditch
1985 	Ritchie Why Dinnya Call? Telecom
1984 	Dad Supa Cloth Fink Prodns, Fred Fink

Radio:
2001 	Mr Western, The Time is Not Yet Ripe ABC, Richard Buckham
Short Film:
2007 	Assassin,    La Croix, Matt Harris
1989 	Harry Zilco,    Blotto    Blotto Prodns, James Ferguson

References

External links
 

Australian male actors
Living people
National Institute of Dramatic Art alumni
Year of birth missing (living people)